Benjamin Joseph Manaly Novak (born July 31, 1979) is an American actor and television writer. He has received five Primetime Emmy Award nominations and won two Screen Actors Guild Awards.

Novak became known for starring as Ryan Howard in the NBC sitcom The Office (2005–2013), for which he also served as a writer and executive producer. He played roles in the films Inglourious Basterds (2009),  Saving Mr. Banks (2013), and The Founder (2016). Novak made his directorial debut in 2022 with the dark comedy thriller Vengeance, which he also wrote and starred in.

He portrays Alistair Smythe in The Amazing Spider-Man 2 (2014).

Beyond his film career, Novak authored the acclaimed books One More Thing: Stories and Other Stories (2014) and The Book with No Pictures (2014).

Early life
Novak was born on July 31, 1979, in Newton, Massachusetts. His parents are Linda (née ) and author William Novak. Novak's family is Jewish. His father co-edited The Big Book of Jewish Humor, and has ghostwritten memoirs for Nancy Reagan, Lee Iacocca, Magic Johnson, and others. Novak has two younger brothers: Lev Novak and composer Jesse Novak.

He attended Solomon Schechter Day School of Greater Boston for elementary school. For middle school he attended Brown Middle School. He went to Camp Ramah in New England in Massachusetts for several summers when he was in 6th, 7th, and 9th grade.

He attended Newton South High School with future The Office costar John Krasinski, and they graduated in 1997. Novak edited one of the school newspapers, The Lion's Roar, and cowrote a satirical play with Krasinski.

Novak graduated from Harvard University in 2001, where he was a member of the Harvard Lampoon. He majored in English and Spanish literature, and wrote his honors thesis on the films of Shakespeare's Hamlet. Aside from the Lampoon, he occasionally staged and performed in a variety show called The B.J. Show with fellow Harvard student B. J. Averell.

Career
Following his graduation from Harvard, he moved to Los Angeles, California and began working in clubs as a comedian. His first live stand-up performance took place at the Hollywood Youth Hostel on October 10, 2001. He was named one of Varietys "Ten Comedians To Watch" in 2003.

Novak was a writer for the short-lived The WB sitcom Raising Dad. He performed on Comedy Central's Premium Blend and on Late Night with Conan O'Brien.

Novak's television acting career began on MTV's Punk'd. He was the lead accomplice to Ashton Kutcher on the show's second season in 2003, playing pranks on Hilary Duff, Rachael Leigh Cook, Usher, and Mýa.

An image of Novak entered the public domain as a stock photo and has been used on various international products, reportedly including a particular type of Calvin Klein cologne in Sweden.

The Office

After hearing Novak's opening joke at a comedy club, executive producer Greg Daniels decided he "wanted to do something with him." Novak was subsequently cast as Ryan Howard, who is first introduced on the show as a temporary employee at Dunder Mifflin in Scranton, Pennsylvania. Novak's character goes through ups and downs throughout his work career and has an on and off relationship with Kelly Kapoor (Mindy Kaling).

Novak was a cast member on the show and also a producer and writer. He, along with Kaling, Greg Daniels, Michael Schur, and Paul Lieberstein, were the original writers for the show. Novak is credited with writing 15 episodes of the show, including the Writers Guild of America nominated episodes "Diversity Day" and "Local Ad".

On July 21, 2010, news reports indicated Novak had signed a contract to remain with the show for its seventh and eighth seasons. Under the new terms, he would be made an executive producer midway through Season 7 and direct two episodes of the show. Novak left The Office after the ninth-season premiere "New Guys", however, he returned to guest-star in the final episode of the series. In a podcast interview Novak did in 2021 on Dax Shepard's show, he confirmed that he had been offered the Season 9 showrunner position but declined it because he decided that his fire for the job had burned out, and it was simply time for him to move on to new projects.

Novak and his fellow writers and producers of The Office were nominated five consecutive times for the Primetime Emmy Award for Outstanding Comedy Series from 2007 to 2011.

In a June 2009 interview with The Philadelphia Inquirer, Novak spoke about sharing the success of The Office with his Newton South High School classmate John Krasinski:"Sometimes when this feels too good to be true, I think that if this were all a dream, that would be what should have tipped me off. I'd wake up saying, "I was in this incredible TV show and it was a big hit and the star was John [Krasinski] from high school. Isn't that weird?"

Post-The Office career

Novak has had supporting roles in Quentin Tarantino's acclaimed 2009 war film Inglourious Basterds, John Lee Hancock's 2013 period drama Saving Mr. Banks about the development of the 1964 film Mary Poppins, and Hancock's 2016 biographical drama The Founder about the founder of McDonald's.

Novak has also appeared in the films Unaccompanied Minors in 2006, Knocked Up in 2007, Reign Over Me in 2007, The Internship in 2013, and The Amazing Spider-Man 2 in 2014.

Novak voiced Baker Smurf in The Smurfs in 2011 and The Smurfs 2 in 2013.

He has starred in a few episodes each of The Mindy Project and The Newsroom, and made cameo appearances in the shows Community and Crazy Ex-Girlfriend. He also served as a consulting producer for the first season of The Mindy Project.

Novak wrote, directed and executive produced a half-hour anthological series called The Premise, released on FX in 2021. Novak starred in the 2022 thriller Vengeance, of which he was also the writer and director. Filming began in March 2020 but was put on hold due to the COVID-19 pandemic until January 2021. In May 2020, it was announced that Novak would be writing and executive producing an upcoming show entitled Young People on HBO Max.

Book deal
On April 11, 2013, publishing house Alfred A. Knopf announced it had signed a seven-figure, two-book deal with Novak, with the first book slated to be a collection of Woody Allen-like fiction stories. On February 4, 2014, a book of 64 stories, One More Thing: Stories and Other Stories, was published and spent 6 weeks on the New York Times Best Sellers Hardcover Fiction List.

Novak also signed a deal with Penguin's children's books label and wrote The Book With No Pictures, which was released on September 30, 2014. As of January 2021, The Book With No Pictures has spent a total of 174 weeks on the New York Times Best Seller Picture Books List since its release, with 34 weeks charting as #1. Its most recent listing was at #10 in September 2020. A self-proclaimed lifelong lover of books, Novak has said he wrote the children's book partially because "to me, there is no more meaningful, important or exciting rule to introduce to children than the power of the written word."

On November 19, 2019, My Book with No Pictures was published as a fill-in-the-blanks companion book to The Book with No Pictures to allow children to write their own story.

The List App 
On October 14, 2015, Novak released an Apple iOS app along with co-founder Dev Flaherty called The List App. The app was nominated for a Webby Award (losing in its category to Beme and Pocket) in 2016. In May 2016, the app was rebranded as 'li.st' and became available on the Android platform. In September 2017, the app was shut down due to lack of users.

Personal life
Novak has a close friendship with Mindy Kaling, whom he met through writing for The Office, and called her "the most important person in my life" (on Fresh Air with Terry Gross). The two dated on and off while writing and acting on the show, sometimes mirroring the on-again, off-again nature of the relationship between their respective characters Ryan Howard and Kelly Kapoor. Novak is the godfather of Kaling's two children. He lives in Los Angeles.

Bibliography

Books

Essays, reporting and other contributions

Publications 

Novak also has a chapter giving advice in Tim Ferriss' book Tools of Titans.

Instagram Live 
Current Mood with John Mayer (February 17, 2019). "Pants".
Special Report on Current Mood with John Mayer (April 19, 2020). "Coronavirus".

Podcast appearances

Filmography

Film

Acting credits

Writing/directing credits

Television

Acting credits

Writing credits

Directing credits

Awards and nominations

References

Footnotes

Works cited

External links

 
 
"The Office's BJ Novak: Uncut", an NPR interview from May 2008

Living people
21st-century American comedians
21st-century American male actors
Actors from Newton, Massachusetts
American comedy writers
American male comedians
American male film actors
American male screenwriters
American male television actors
American television writers
Comedians from Massachusetts
The Harvard Lampoon alumni
Jewish American male actors
Jewish American writers
Jewish American male comedians
Male actors from Massachusetts
American male television writers
The New Yorker people
Writers Guild of America Award winners
Writers from Newton, Massachusetts
Hasty Pudding alumni
Screenwriters from Massachusetts
1979 births
Newton South High School alumni
21st-century American screenwriters
21st-century American male writers
21st-century American Jews